The 2008 Copa Sudamericana Finals was a two-legged football match-up to determine the 2008 Copa Sudamericana champion. The final was contested by Brazilian club Internacional and Argentine team Estudiantes de La Plata. The first leg, held in Estadio Ciudad de La Plata, was won by Internacional 1–0. As the second leg, held in Estádio Beira-Rio in Porto Alegre ended in a 1–1 tie, Internacional became champions of the competition winning 4–1 on points (2–1 on aggregate).

Qualified teams

Venues

Match summary

First leg

Second leg

References

f
Copa Sudamericana Finals
s
s
s
s
Football in Buenos Aires Province